The Gamer Symphony Orchestra at the University of Maryland (often referred to as the GSO, UMGSO, or UMDGSO) is a student-run symphony orchestra and chorus at the University of Maryland. The orchestra is the first collegiate ensemble to draw its repertoire exclusively from the music of video games. Most of GSO's members are non-music majors The orchestra holds a free concert every semester during the academic year and yearly charity fundraisers that benefit Children's National Hospital in Washington, D.C.

History
Michelle Eng, a violist in the School of Music's Repertoire Orchestra, founded GSO in the fall of 2005. The group's first public performance was April 29, 2006, and featured about 20 musicians. The GSO added a choir in the fall of 2007, by which time the ensemble totaled 50 musicians. As of spring 2010 the orchestra had 100 members, including 30 choral singers. By fall of 2010, its numbers had surpassed 100, and as of spring 2013, membership is at 120. The orchestra continues to boast large membership consisting of 100+ members every semester.

The development of this orchestra mirrors the acceptance of classical music concerts anchored by video game music in the United States.  Eng founded this group after having been inspired by Video Games Live, the Dear Friends concert series, and "Video Game Pianist" Martin Leung.

Composer Jonathan Coulton complimented the GSO's 2008 performance of "Still Alive," from the popular video game "Portal," calling it a "fantastic cover" in a post on his blog.  This recording was posted to OC ReMix as only the second live recording in the history of the site—the first accepted ReMix of music from "Portal."  OC ReMix founder David Lloyd was present for GSO's first live performance of "Still Alive."

The GSO's concert on December 11, 2010 overfilled the capacity of the 1,170-seat Dekelboum Concert Hall, the largest concert hall at the university's Clarice Smith Performing Arts Center.

The Video Games Live concert on February 26, 2011, at Strathmore in Bethesda, Md., featured "a special contribution" from the GSO. GSO and Video Games Live staff began discussing collaborative possibilities in August 2010 for the pair of Strathmore concerts. VGL founder Tommy Tallarico chose to include an adapted version of GSO's arrangement of "Korobeiniki" ("A-Type") from Tetris in the Strathmore concert programs. The National Philharmonic Orchestra and Chorale performed the piece, arranged by GSO Conductor Emeritus Greg Cox. Former GSO Music Director and current singer Chris Apple performed the piece's tenor solo. The arrangement appeared on Video Games Live's third album which was released in February 2014.

The ensemble's spring 2011 concert featured Mark Cromer, the senior sound designer for Big Huge Games, as a guest banjo player. Cromer joined the GSO for a medley of "Banjo-Kazooie" themes, with an arrangement by tubist David Scherr. Grant Kirkhope, who composed the original music, attended the performance. The spring concert, at which the GSO observed its fifth anniversary, also featured a performance of "Electric de Chocobo" from "Final Fantasy VII" by the Magruder High School Gamer Symphony Orchestra.

Video Games Live again performed GSO's Korobeiniki arrangement, under the title "Tetris Opera," at L.A. Live's Nokia Theatre on June 8, 2011. The show (VGL's 200th) was put on in partnership with the Electronic Entertainment Expo.

Spring 2012 marked the first semester in which the GSO performed outside of the University of Maryland. First, at the Music and Gaming Festival (MAGFest) X, and second at the Smithsonian American Art Museum, as part of the Art of Video Games exhibit.

The ensemble dedicated its spring 2013 concert to the memory of its tubist, David Scherr, who died in December 2012. Shortly after his passing, the orchestra purchased the tuba that Scherr had been renting and had his name engraved on it. The tuba is now loaned to members who are unable to provide their own instrument.

After the 2013 semester ended, Chris Apple, Ayla Hurley, Rob Garner, and other alums founded the Washington Metropolitan Gamer Symphony Orchestra in Rockville, MD as an outlet for GSO graduates and other community musicians to come together and perform video game music.

In 2015, the GSO returned to the Smithsonian American Art Museum to perform as part of the “Watch This! Revelations in Media Art” exhibition.

The fall 2015 and spring 2016 semesters marked the 10th year milestone for the GSO’s foundation and first public performance respectively. Alongside the celebrations, in fall 2015, the GSO started live streaming its concerts on Twitch.

In March 2018, the orchestra performed at the Kennedy Center on Millennium Stage, as part of their Direct Current performances, and featured many emeritus members. The orchestra performed various pieces which included Apotheosis, from the game Journey, which was personally approved by the composer Austin Wintory.

Concertography

Performance venues have included the University of Maryland's Hoff Theater, Memorial Chapel and Clarice Smith Performing Arts Center, the Smithsonian American Art Museum, and the Kennedy Center.

Full recordings of recent concerts can be downloaded from the group's website.

Arrangements

Group members produce the arrangements that this orchestra performs. Anyone is allowed to submit an arrangement, however each piece is run through a critique and voted on by the group’s music committee (consisting of the music director, the orchestra conductors, choral conductor, and the vice president) before it is accepted and put into the program for a given semester.

Legacy
The Maryland GSO hopes to inspire and assist in the creation of more GSOs in the future. They have openly encouraged high school and college students who are interested in starting a GSO at their school to contact them.

The GSO's fall 2008 concert inspired students at Magruder High School in Rockville, Md., to found their own video game orchestra. The similarly named Magruder Gamer Symphony Orchestra performs regularly at the high school's instrumental music concerts as the only non-classroom ensemble.

In fall 2010, the Maryland GSO helped to establish a similar ensemble at Damascus High School in Damascus, Md.

Upon hearing about the Maryland GSO, a student at Ithaca College founded the Ithaca College GSO in 2011. The ensemble's premiere concert was November 11, 2012.

Tyler Modesto was inspired by the “Art of Video Games” exhibit at the Smithsonian American Art Museum and started the 8-bit Orchestra at the University of Delaware.

See also
Video game music
Video Games Live
Play! A Video Game Symphony

Notes

References

External links
 The Gamer Symphony Orchestra at the University of Maryland homepage
 Gamer Symphony Orchestra profile on OC ReMix
 Magruder High School Gamer Symphony Orchestra homepage
 

Video game musicians
University of Maryland, College Park student organizations
2005 establishments in Maryland
Musical groups established in 2005
University orchestras
Video gaming in the United States
Orchestras based in Maryland